Jana McCall is an art therapist and American singer-songwriter and visual artist from the Pacific Northwest.  She played bass guitar in the short lived all-female band Dickless. 
After Dickless, she worked briefly with Mark Pickerel (formerly of Screaming Trees) and the band Ruby Doe.  
Her solo career spanned 1998 to 2002 during which she released two albums; the eponymous Jana McCall and Slumber. She had three songs featured on Up Records compilations.

During her solo career, she was known for creating sorrowful yet powerful songs with subtle, eerie atmospheres.

Jana is a mental health counselor specializing in art therapy in Seattle, Washington. (Jana McCall Expressive Therapy)

Discography

Albums 
 Jana McCall album from Up Records; UP #049 (1998)
 Slumber album from Up Records; UP #094 (2002)

Compilations 
 Days Gone from the Up Records compilation Up In Orbit!; UP #045 (1997)
 Echoes, a cover of the Pink Floyd song., from the Up Records compilation Up Next; UP #060 (1998)
 Bloodlines from the Up Records and Slabco Records compilation US: Up Records and Slabco; UP #079 (2000)

External links
 https://www.janamccallexpressivetherapy.com/
 JanaMcCall.com

References 

American rock bass guitarists
American women singer-songwriters
American singer-songwriters
Women bass guitarists
Living people
Year of birth missing (living people)
21st-century American women